(born 1964) is a Japanese musician, producer, and designer.

Life
Fujiwara was born in Ise, Mie. He moved to Tokyo at eighteen and became a standout in the Harajuku street fashion scene. During a trip to New York City in the early 1980s he was introduced to hip hop; taking American records back to Tokyo, he became one of Japan's first hip hop DJs, and is credited with popularizing the genre in Japan. He subsequently went into music producing, specializing in remixes.

He is known as a godfather of Ura-Harajuku fashion and is a globally influential streetwear designer, including being the pioneer for Nike's "HTM" line, and the "Fenom" line for Levis. He launched his first brand, Good Enough, in the late 1980s.

Good Enough eventually gave way to a new project: Fragment Design, the brand which Fujiwara dedicates most of his time as a creative to in today's time.

In 2003, he appeared in the film Lost in Translation. As a musician, he has collaborated with many artists, among them are his friends Kahimi Karie, Janis Ian, Ua, and Eric Clapton. In 2003 he designed a guitar for Clapton which was custom made by Martin Guitars for some performances in Japan. After an initial run of eight, Martin built a total of 476 of these ornate black guitars. Another Fujiwara-Clapton guitar followed in 2006.

In 2008, Fujiwara made a rare public appearance in the U.S. and participated in the Imprint Culture Lab's Cult of Collaboration panel.

See also
Nigo
Japanese street fashion
Jun Takahashi
A Bathing Ape
Visvim

References

External links
 Blog at Honeyee.com 
 Interview with Hiroshi at Theme Magazine 
 Interview with Hiroshi at Complex.com (English)
 The Cult of Collaboration panel at Imprint Culture Lab 2008 
 HF x jeffstaple 1on1 at Imprint Culture Lab 2008 
 Advisory Staff Blog 
 Fujiwara Hiroshi at Instagram 

1964 births
Japanese male musicians
Japanese musicians
Japanese fashion designers
Living people
Musicians from Mie Prefecture
People from Ise, Mie